Gorytvesica tenera is a species of moth of the family Tortricidae. It is found in Napo Province, Ecuador.

The wingspan is 17 mm. The forewings are ferruginous, suffused with brown up to middle. There are white blotches marked with brown dots at the wing edges. The hindwings are grey creamy, mixed with brownish apically.

Etymology
The species name refers to the forewing markings and is derived from Latin tenera (meaning delicate).

References

Moths described in 2005
Euliini
Moths of South America
Taxa named by Józef Razowski